Changing the Guard (Hungarian: Örségváltás) is a 1942 Hungarian drama film directed by Viktor Bánky and starring Antal Páger, Gyula Csortos and Valéria Hidvéghy. A talented young engineer is frustrated by the reactionary management of his factory who constantly overlook him. Eventually his talent is recognised by the authorities and he is appointed to run the factory and clear out the old guard. It was the second of two films with overtly nationalistic themes that Bánky and Páger made in 1942. The previous film Dr. Kovács István had dealt with similar issues in Hungarian society.

Cast
 Antal Páger as Takács Péter 
 Gyula Csortos as Kály Zsiga 
 Valéria Hidvéghy as Marianna, Kályék lánya 
 Dezső Kertész as Zubiczky 
 Margit Ladomerszky as Kályné 
 Zoltán Makláry as Vargha bácsi 
 Béla Mihályffi as Szegõ Lipót 
 Zoltán Szakáts as Bajkó László 
 Mariska Vízváry as Pepi néni 
 Nándor Bihary as Fodor 
 Jenö Danis as Ferenc, altiszt 
 Béla Fáy as Kallós 
 Irén Pelsöczy as Szepesy testvére 
 Vera Szemere as Magda, Bajkó felesége 
 Béla Vizi as Gróf Szepesy Miklós

References

Bibliography
 Cunningham, John. Hungarian Cinema: From Coffee House to Multiplex. Wallflower Press, 2004.

External links

1942 films
1942 drama films
Hungarian drama films
1940s Hungarian-language films
Films directed by Viktor Bánky
Hungarian black-and-white films